Cox's Bazar Sadar is an upazila of Cox's Bazar District in the Division of Chittagong, Bangladesh.

Geography
It has 38688 households and total area .

Demographics
At the 1991 Bangladesh census, Cox's Bazar Sadar had a population of 253,788, of whom 117,509 were aged 18 or older. Males constituted 53.94% of the population, and females 46.06%. Cox's Bazar Sadar had an average literacy rate of 28.3% (7+ years), against the national average of 32.4%.

Administration
In 1854, the Cox's Bazar police station and the Town Committee in 1959 were formed. In 1972, the town committee was demolished and turned into a municipality. In 1983, the thana was turned into an upazila. 

Cox's Bazar Sadar Upazila is divided into Cox's Bazar Municipality and five union parishads: Choufolidondi, Jhilongjha, Khurushkhul, Patali Machuakhali, and Varuakhali. The union parishads are subdivided into 20 mauzas and 144 villages.

Cox's Bazar Municipality is subdivided into 12 wards and 97 mahallas.

See also
Upazilas of Bangladesh
Districts of Bangladesh
Divisions of Bangladesh

References

Upazilas of Cox's Bazar District